This is a list of Dutch television related events from 2003.

Events
1 March - Esther Hart is selected to represent Netherlands at the 2003 Eurovision Song Contest with her song "One More Night". She is selected to be the forty-fourth Dutch Eurovision entry during Nationaal Songfestival held at Ahoy in Rotterdam.
9 March - Jamai Loman wins the first series of Idols.
March - Release date of Jamai Loman's debut single, "Step Right Up".

Debuts

Television shows

1950s
NOS Journaal (1956–present)

1970s
Sesamstraat (1976–present)

1980s
Jeugdjournaal (1981–present)
Het Klokhuis (1988–present)

1990s
Goede tijden, slechte tijden (1990–present)
Big Brother (1999-2006)
De Club van Sinterklaas (1999-2009)

2000s
Idols (2002-2008, 2016–present)

Ending this year

Births

Deaths

See also
2003 in the Netherlands